Joe Palooka in Humphrey Takes a Chance is a 1950 American film directed by Jean Yarbrough. It was part of the Joe Palooka series.

Plot
Knobby Walsh manages the champ, but unless he agrees to promoter Gordon Rogers' demand for 30 percent of the profits, Rogers intends to see to it that Joe Palooka can't get another fight.

An irate Knobby claims he can get the popular Joe a fight anywhere in the world, even in Wokkington Falls, where the sweet oaf Humphrey Pennyworth still lives. Joe and wife Anne are glad to go visit their old friend Humphrey, but complications occur when Rogers bribes the mayor and sheriff to frame Knobby and Humphrey on false charges. Joe eventually is able to clear both and save the day.

Cast
 Leon Errol as Knobby
 Joe Kirkwood, Jr. as Joe Palooka
 Lois Collier as Anne
 Robert Coogan as Humphrey
 Mary Happy as Mary
 Tom Neal as Rogers
 Andrew Tombes as Grogan

External links
Joe Palooka in Humphrey Takes a Chance at TCMDB

1950 films
American black-and-white films
Films directed by Jean Yarbrough
Films based on American comics
American action comedy films
1950s action comedy films
1950s American films
Joe Palooka films